Aloye Pole is a rural locality (a settlement) and the administrative center of Rostashevskoye Rural Settlement, Paninsky District, Voronezh Oblast, Russia. The population was 574 as of 2010. There are 6 streets.

Geography 
Aloye Pole is located 9 km southwest of Panino (the district's administrative centre) by road. Mirovka is the nearest rural locality.

References 

Rural localities in Paninsky District